Nuuk Port and Harbour is the largest port in Greenland. It is located in the southeastern area of the city of Nuuk known as Old Nuuk. The harbour entrance is restricted due to tides during much of the year, and ice during winter.

The inner port area is home to a marina for smaller vessels and ferries. And larger vessels to the east side of the port area.

Container area is located east of the ferry terminal with an area for container storage and processing. The container area was moved from the south side to the east in 2016.

References

Transport in Nuuk
Ports and harbours of Greenland
Ports and harbors of the Arctic Ocean